Agnelo dos Santos Queiroz Filho (born November 9, 1958) is a Brazilian politician and member of the Workers' Party (PT) since 2008. He has served as the Governor of the Federal District of Brazil from January 1, 2011 until December 31st 2014.

Political career 
Elected district deputy in the first election for the Legislative Assembly of the Federal District in 1990 by PCdoB. The parliamentary activity accredited him for a position as a federal deputy in 1994, re-electing in 1998 and again in 2002. He was co-author, along with Senator Paulista Pedro Piva, of Law No. 10,264 of July 16, 2001, known as Law Agnelo/Piva establishing the transfer of 2% of the gross revenues of all lotteries to the Brazilian Olympic Committee .
He was sports minister in the Lula government in 2003 until 2006, when he licensed to apply in elections that year to one of the chairs of the Senate of the Federal District. Even defeated by Joaquim Roriz, he got a significant voting with 544,313 votes, 42.93% of the valid votes.
He holds the position of Director of the National Health Surveillance Agency since October 24, 2007, and left PCdoB and soon after, the July 9, 2008, is affiliated to the Workers' Party.

Elections 2010 
On October 31, 2010, was elected by PT as governor of the Federal District with vice governor Tadeu Filippelli by PMDB. Agnelo received 66.1% of the votes, against 33.9% of Weslian Roriz (PSC), wife of former governor Joaquim Roriz (PSC). Agnelo was elected presenting proposals to create a single ticket on public transport, create 400 Family Health Teams and Emergency Unit in each of the 30 administrative regions of the DF, halve the number of commissioned positions, appointing public employees, beyond to build at least 100 thousand housing units.

References

1958 births
Governors of the Federal District (Brazil)
Workers' Party (Brazil) politicians
Living people
Sports ministers of Brazil